The Lyon Center or Lyon Recreation Center is a student recreational facility and part-time varsity athletics facility located on the campus of the University of Southern California in Los Angeles. The Lyon Center's full name is the General William Lyon University Center and is named for William Lyon, a former General in the United States Army Air Corps and United States Air Force. The facility is adjacent to the Uytengsu Aquatics Center.

History
The Lyon Center opened in 1989 as the Student Recreation Center for the University of Southern California. The main gym also serves as a home for the USC Trojans men's and women's varsity volleyball teams. From 1989 to 2006, the North Gym in the USC Physical Education building and the Lyon Center split time as the team's home court. In 2007, the teams moved to the Galen Center as their home court, but use the North Gym and Lyon Center main gym if the Galen Center is reserved for other events. The USC Trojans men's basketball team has also used the main gym for exhibition games. 

The Lyon Center had its second floor renovated in 2008. In 2011, the basketball courts and locker rooms were renovated. The Lyon Center underwent another renovation and expansion in 2017.

Amenities
1,500-seat main gym (Intramural sports–badminton, basketball, volleyball, and varsity men's and women's volleyball)
Klug Family Fitness Center (weight room)
Racquetball and squash courts
Stretching room 
Table tennis tables
Bouldering wall
Group exercise studio
Dance room
Locker rooms

See also
University of Southern California
USC Trojans

References

External links
Lyon Center official website

Badminton venues
Basketball venues in Los Angeles
College basketball venues in the United States
College volleyball venues in the United States
Squash venues in the United States
University and college student recreation centers in the United States
University of Southern California
USC Trojans basketball venues
USC Trojans sports venues
USC Trojans men's volleyball venues
USC Trojans women's volleyball venues
Volleyball venues in Los Angeles
Sports venues completed in 1989
1989 establishments in California